Aenictus arya is a species of light brown army ant found in India, specifically Karnataka and West Bengal.

References

Dorylinae
Hymenoptera of Asia
Insects described in 1901